Jafir-e Do (also Romanized as Jafīr-e Do) is a village in Bani Saleh Rural District, Neysan District, Hoveyzeh County, Khuzestan Province, Iran. At the 2006 census, its population was 69, in 14 families.

References 

Populated places in Hoveyzeh County